Jerry & Marge Go Large is a 2022 American comedy-drama film directed by David Frankel and written by Brad Copeland. Based on Jason Fagone's 2018 HuffPost article of the same name, the film stars Bryan Cranston and Annette Bening.

The film premiered at the Tribeca Film Festival on June 15, 2022, and was released on Paramount+ on June 17, 2022.

Premise
Married couple Jerry and Marge Selbee live in Evart, Michigan. Jerry retires after working forty-two years as a production line manager. One day, Jerry figures out a statistical loophole to repeatedly win the WinFall lottery in Michigan, and then in Massachusetts. He deduces that by purchasing a sufficiently large quantity of tickets, the "rolldown" guarantees a return greater than the cost of the tickets. Jerry and Marge decide to use the prize money to revitalize Evart.

The film is based on a true story.

Cast
 Bryan Cranston as Jerry Selbee
 Annette Bening as Marge Selbee
 Rainn Wilson as Bill
 Larry Wilmore as Steve
 Michael McKean as Howard
 Ann Harada as Shirley
 Jake McDorman as Doug Selbee
 Anna Camp as Dawn Selbee
 Devyn McDowell as Liz
 Uly Schlesinger as Tyler Langford
 Cheech Manohar as Eric
 Tracie Thoms as Maya
 Lindsay Rootare as Mindy
 Tori Kelly as herself

Production
In April 2018, it was reported that Levantine Films and Netter Films would produce a film adaptation of Jason Fagone's HuffPost article "Jerry and Marge Go Large", with Brad Copeland writing the screenplay. In June 2021, it was announced that Paramount+ had greenlit the film, set to be directed by David Frankel and star Bryan Cranston and Annette Bening.

Filming began in July 2021 in Georgia, with Rainn Wilson, Larry Wilmore and Jake McDorman joining the cast. In August 2021, Uly Schlesinger, Michael McKean, Anna Camp, Ann Harada, and Devyn McDowell joined the cast.

Release
The film had its world premiere at the Tribeca Film Festival on June 15, 2022. It was released on Paramount+ on June 17, 2022.

Reception

References

External links
 
 "Jerry and Marge Go Large" by Jason Fagone

2022 comedy films
2020s American films
2020s English-language films
American films based on actual events
American comedy films
Comedy films based on actual events
Films about lotteries
Films based on Internet-based works
Films directed by David Frankel
Films scored by Jake Monaco
Films set in Michigan
Films shot in Georgia (U.S. state)
Films with screenplays by Brad Copeland
Media Rights Capital films
Paramount Players films
Paramount+ original films